Eubleekeria jonesi, commonly known as Jones’s pony fish, is a marine rat-finned fish, a ponyfish from the family Leiognathidae. It is native to the Indian Ocean. This species was first formally described as Leiognathus jonesi in 1971 by the Indian ichthyologist P.S.B.R. James (1934-2019) and its specific name honours James’ predecessor as director of the Indian Central Marine Fisheries Institute in Kochi, Santhappan Jones (1910-1997).

References

Fish of India
Fish of China
Fish described in 1971
Fish of the Indian Ocean
Bioluminescent fish
Eubleekeria